2016 ICC Women's World Twenty20 was the fifth edition of ICC Women's World Twenty20. The tournament was hosted in India for the first time. Australia were the defending champions, after winning the 2014 tournament in Bangladesh.

Below is a list of the squads which participated in the 2016 ICC Women's World Twenty20. The lists display the player's age and the number of T20I matches played (excluding the warm-up matches) at the start of the tournament.

Australia 
On 9 February 2016, Cricket Australia announced its squad.
Coach:  Matthew Mott

1On 11 March 2016, Cricket Australia reported it was withdrawing Grace Harris, diagnosed with deep vein thrombosis and named Nicola Carey as replacement.

Bangladesh 
On 10 February 2016, the Bangladesh Cricket Board announced its squad.
Coach:  Janak Gamage

England 
On 17 February 2016, the England and Wales Cricket Board announced its squad.
Coach:  Mark Robinson

1On 22 March 2016, the England and Wales Cricket Board reported it was withdrawing Danielle Hazell, due to a calf injury and named Laura Marsh as replacement.

India 
On 5 February 2016, the Board of Control for Cricket in India announced its squad.
Coach:  Purnima Rau

Ireland 
On 19 January 2016, Cricket Ireland announced its squad.
Coach:  Aaron Hamilton

New Zealand 
On 3 February 2016, New Zealand Cricket announced its squad.
Coach:  Haidee Tiffen

Pakistan 
On 10 February 2016, the Pakistan Cricket Board announced its squad.
Coach:  Mohtashim Rasheed

1On 9 March 2016, the Pakistan Cricket Board reported it was withdrawing Sania Khan due to a fractured thumb and named Diana Baig as replacement.

South Africa 
On 25 February 2016, Cricket South Africa announced its squad.
Coach:  Hilton Moreeng

Sri Lanka 
On 9 February 2016, Sri Lanka Cricket announced its squad.
Coach:  Lanka de Silva

West Indies 
On 13 January 2016, the West Indies Cricket Board announced its squad.
Coach:  Vasbert Drakes

References

External links
 2016 ICC Women's World Twenty20 squads on CricInfo

ICC Women's World Twenty20 squads
2016 ICC Women's World Twenty20